James Enright may refer to:
 James Enright (referee), American basketball referee and sportswriter
 James Enright (athlete), Canadian Paralympic athlete
 Jim T. Enright, professor of behavioral physiology